The 1970–71 season was the 72nd season for FC Barcelona.

La Liga

League table

Results

References

External links

webdelcule.com

FC Barcelona seasons
Barcelona